is a Japanese video game developer best known for the Wild Arms and Chaos Rings series of role-playing video games. They were one of the first companies developing games for the PlayStation and enjoyed a close relationship with Japan Studio in their early years.

History
The company was founded in 1993 by former members of Riot, a subsidiary of Telenet Japan responsible for developing the Tenshi no Uta series for PC Engine.

Games developed

References

External links
 

Video game companies established in 1993
Video game companies of Japan
Video game development companies
Japanese companies established in 1993
Software companies based in Tokyo